Richard Craig Oppel (born August 10, 1967) is an American former competition swimmer who represented the United States at the 1988 Summer Olympics in Seoul, South Korea.  Oppel earned a gold medal by swimming for the winning U.S. team in the preliminary heats of the men's 4×200-meter freestyle relay.

Oppel enrolled in the University of California, Los Angeles (UCLA), and swam for coach Ron Ballatore's UCLA Bruins swimming and diving team in National Collegiate Athletic Association (NCAA) competition.

See also
 List of University of California, Los Angeles people
 List of Olympic medalists in swimming (men)

References

1967 births
Living people
American male freestyle swimmers
Olympic gold medalists for the United States in swimming
People from Keflavík
Swimmers at the 1988 Summer Olympics
UCLA Bruins men's swimmers
Medalists at the 1988 Summer Olympics
Universiade medalists in swimming
Universiade gold medalists for the United States
Medalists at the 1985 Summer Universiade